The following lists the Anglican dioceses in the Church of England, the Church in Wales, the Scottish Episcopal Church and the Church of Ireland. For a list of all dioceses worldwide see List of Anglican dioceses.

Church of England

Church in Wales

Scottish Episcopal Church

Church of Ireland

See also
List of Anglican dioceses (worldwide)
List of Church of England dioceses
List of Anglican diocesan bishops in Britain and Ireland
Religion in the United Kingdom

United Kingdom and Ireland
Anglicanism in the United Kingdom
Ireland religion-related lists
United Kingdom religion-related lists
United Kingdom and Ireland